The 2023 IHF Emerging Nations Handball Championship is the fourth edition of the IHF Emerging Nations Championship held in Bulgaria under the aegis of International Handball Federation from 25 to 30 April 2023.

Participating teams

1 Bold indicates champion for that year. Italics indicates host.

Draw
The draw was held on 10 March 2023.

Preliminary round

Group A

Group B

Group C

Group D

Knockout stage

Bracket

Fifth place bracket

Ninth place bracket

9–12th place semifinals

5–8th place semifinals

Semifinals

Eleventh place game

Ninth place game

Seventh place game

Fifth place game

Third place game

Final

Final ranking

References

External links
IHF website

2023
International sports competitions hosted by Bulgaria
IHF Emerging Nations Championship
IHF Emerging Nations Handball Championship
April 2023 sports events in Europe
Emerging Nations